Kyogle may refer to:
Kyogle, town in New South Wales
Kyogle (beetle), insect genus
Kyogle Council, government area in Northern Rivers 
Kyogle railway station, in North Coast line
Kyogle Turkeys, Rugby league club in Australia